Kázsmárk is a village in Borsod-Abaúj-Zemplén County in northeastern Hungary.

Notable residents
 János Fogarasi (1801–1878), jurist and philologist
 Tamás Péchy (1828–1897), politician

References

Populated places in Borsod-Abaúj-Zemplén County